William Beaton (born 30 September 1935) is a Scottish former footballer who played in the Football League for Aston Villa. Beaton played one match for Villa in which he conceded six goals in a 6–3 defeat against Leicester City.

References

Scottish footballers
English Football League players
1935 births
Living people
Dunfermline Athletic F.C. players
Aston Villa F.C. players
Airdrieonians F.C. (1878) players
Alloa Athletic F.C. players
Sauchie F.C. players
People from Kincardine, Fife
Scottish Football League players
Association football goalkeepers